Orange Espagne S.A.U., more commonly known by its trade name of Orange España, is a mobile network operator in Spain. It was previously known as Amena, a brand of Retevisión, until 2005, when it was bought by France Télécom (now Orange S.A.). Its competitors are Movistar, Vodafone Spain and Grupo MásMóvil’s Yoigo network.

Its legal headquarters are in Pozuelo de Alarcón, near Madrid.

Orange España is the second mobile phone provider of the four Spanish providers (Movistar, Orange, Vodafone and Yoigo), with 11 million customers. The company also offers TV and Internet (ADSL, FTTH) services. However, Orange España has a 'very bad' rating of 1.2 on Trustpilot for its service (as of February 2023) with an incredibly high 94% of 1,849 reviews giving the organisation 1 star. This is only marginally better than Vodafone España, which has a Trustpilot rating of 1.1 from 4,121 reviews  

Many of the complaints about Orange España relate to customer service as well as contractual services. Customer reviews statements include: 'Beware and avoid - Orange Spain are ladrones', 'proven to scam foreigners' , 'The worst customer service ever', 'Will be leaving orange as soon as possible', 'Paying fees without service for a year and counting', 'Horrible'. Scam', 'Scam company of the year', 'Simple the worst company in Spain' and 'I have never dealt with such an unhelpful company as this... I have given a 1 star rating because it wasn't possible to give zero but if there was a minus star that would be my rating....terrible' - the list goes on and on with damning reviews from people from all over the world dating all the way back to 2014 - almost 10 years, more than half of the time the company was actually founded.

Orange offers GSM 900/1800 MHz (2G), UMTS 2100MHz (3G) HSDPA (3.5G) and LTE (4G) services. Its network radio access serves to the following MVNOs: MasMovil, Happy Móvil, Jazztel Movil, Día Móvil, República Móvil, Pepephone, Simyo, among others.

See also
Orange S.A.

References

External links 

Orange mobile phone coverage
France Telecom España company profile — Hoover's

Companies based in the Community of Madrid
Orange S.A.
Mobile phone companies of Spain